Tuppal is a rural locality in the central south part of the Riverina.  It is situated by road, about 43 kilometres south east from Deniliquin and 53 kilometres north west from Tocumwal.

Notes and references

Towns in the Riverina
Towns in New South Wales